Beagle Bros was an American software company that specialized in creating personal computing products. Their primary focus was on the Apple II family of computers. Although they ceased business in 1991, owner Mark Simonsen permitted the Beagle Bros name and logo to be included on the 30th anniversary reboot of I. O. Silver, released on December 12, 2014 by former Beagle programmer Randy Brandt.

History
Beagle Bros was founded in 1980 by Bert Kersey and expanded over the years to include a wide variety of staff members, programmers, and designers. Whereas most software companies focused on professional users and business systems, Kersey founded the company with the intention of capitalizing on the "hobbyist" market that had formed when affordable personal computers became more readily available. Apple Mechanic allowed users to create their own shape tables (an early form of sprites) to create their own games, DOS Boss let users patch the disk operating system, and Beagle Bag had a number of games written in BASIC that people could utilize. Beagle Bros' catalog and print advertisements featured many playful programming tips about the Apple II system, many in the form of short Applesoft BASIC programs that took advantage of undocumented or unexpected behavior. Beagle Bros used woodcut and other 19th century artwork in its printed designs.

When the Apple IIGS was released, Beagle Bros was among the first companies to release content for the platform. Both Platinum Paint and BeagleWrite GS (acquired and repackaged) are still regarded as being among the high points of commercial IIGS software.

Beagle Bros began producing add-ons for the AppleWorks, its first being the MacroWorks keyboard shortcut utility by Randy Brandt. Beagle Bros programmer Alan Bird later devised an API for creating AppleWorks add-ons, which they dubbed TimeOut. TimeOut programmers Alan Bird, Randy Brandt and Rob Renstrom were tapped by Claris to develop AppleWorks 3.0, and the TimeOut API itself became a part of AppleWorks with version 4.0. Eventually the TimeOut API was made public and a number of non-Beagle TimeOut applications were released.

In 1991, Mark Simonsen licensed the Beagle Bros Apple II line to Quality Computers. Quality Computers subsequently went through several acquisitions and no longer exists. Multiple Beagle Bros products were released as freeware in the mid-1990s, including most of the company's early utilities and games. Today, their programs are available on the Internet.

BeagleWorks, the company's main Macintosh product, was licensed to WordPerfect Corporation in 1992, where it became WordPerfect Works. This product was later discontinued after WordPerfect was acquired by Novell. The company also produced a few small Macintosh and PC utilities.

Many former employees have continued to be involved in the software industry, such as Joe Holt who co-authored iMovie, and Alan Bird who worked on Eudora and the OneClick shortcut utility for Macintosh. Randy Brandt created Online Army Knife, an award-winning Macintosh spell checker, and continued publishing AppleWorks products through his JEM Software spin-off. Mark Munz created Deja ][, which allows AppleWorks to run under Mac OS X. The company's founder, Bert Kersey, started a model train company after selling Beagle Bros, and is now retired.

Software

References

External links
The Beagle Bros Online Museum
The Beagle Brothers Software repository
Beagle Bros' software at the Lost Classics Project
Backyard Barn Owls — Beagle Bros' founder's current Web site about barn owls (includes contact link)

American companies established in 1980
American companies disestablished in 1991
Apple II software
Companies based in San Diego
Software companies established in 1980
Software companies disestablished in 1991
Defunct companies based in California
Defunct software companies of the United States
Privately held companies based in California